North Bend is a village in Miami Township, Hamilton County, Ohio, United States, along the Ohio River. It is a part of the Greater Cincinnati area. The population was 835 at the 2020 census.

History

North Bend was founded in 1789. It was platted as Symmes City but ultimately never took that name. Instead, it was incorporated as the village of North Bend in 1845. It is named for its location, where the Ohio River meanders to the north.

President Benjamin Harrison was born in North Bend. It was the home of his grandfather, President William Henry Harrison. North Bend is the location of the grave of John Cleves Symmes at Congress Green Cemetery and of the William Henry Harrison Tomb State Memorial, the grave of William Henry Harrison. John Scott Harrison, the only man in U.S. history to be the son of a president and the father of a president, was born in North Bend and is buried in his father's vault in North Bend. Eliza Hendricks, wife of U.S. Vice President Thomas A. Hendricks, also was born in North Bend.

On May 5, 1865, North Bend was the site of an early hold-up of a railway train.

Geography
North Bend is located at  (39.149658, -84.745828).

Demographics

2010 census
As of the census of 2010, there were 857 people, 370 households, and 278 families living in the village. The racial makeup of the village was 97.3% White, 0.6% African American, 0.1% Native American, 0.5% Asian, 0.8% from other races, and 0.7% from two or more races. Hispanic or Latino of any race were 1.2% of the population.

There were 370 households, of which 20.8% had children under the age of 18 living with them, 61.9% were married couples living together, 8.9% had a female householder with no husband present, 4.3% had a male householder with no wife present, and 24.9% were non-families. 21.6% of all households were made up of individuals, and 10.6% had someone living alone who was 65 years of age or older. The average household size was 2.32 and the average family size was 2.63.

The median age in the village was 52.7 years. 15.9% of residents were under the age of 18; 7.3% were between the ages of 18 and 24; 15.8% were from 25 to 44; 37.3% were from 45 to 64; and 23.7% were 65 years of age or older. The gender makeup of the village was 50.1% male and 49.9% female.

2000 census
As of the census of 2000, there were 603 people, 253 households, and 182 families living in the village. The population density was 560.3 people per square mile (215.6/km2). There were 290 housing units at an average density of 269.5 per square mile (103.7/km2). The racial makeup of the village was 99.83% White and 0.17% African American.

There were 253 households, out of which 28.1% had children under the age of 18 living with them, 58.1% were married couples living together, 8.7% had a female householder with no husband present, and 27.7% were non-families. 24.1% of all households were made up of individuals, and 11.9% had someone living alone who was 65 years of age or older. The average household size was 2.38 and the average family size was 2.80.

In the village, the population was spread out, with 22.2% under the age of 18, 7.3% from 18 to 24, 23.4% from 25 to 44, 31.2% from 45 to 64, and 15.9% who were 65 years of age or older. The median age was 43 years. For every 100 females, there were 93.3 males. For every 100 females age 18 and over, there were 92.2 males.

The median income for a household in the village was $51,979, and the median income for a family was $60,833. Males had a median income of $45,000 versus $26,563 for females. The per capita income for the village was $28,792. About 4.9% of families and 6.5% of the population were below the poverty line, including 10.1% of those under age 18 and 4.5% of those age 65 or over.

See also
 List of cities and towns along the Ohio River

References

External links
 Village website

Villages in Hamilton County, Ohio
Villages in Ohio
Ohio populated places on the Ohio River
1789 establishments in the United States